Jorge Amadu Embaló (born 20 July 1999) basketball player who plays for Sporting CP.

References

1999 births
Living people
Portuguese men's basketball players
Small forwards
Sporting CP basketball players